Esmail Kandi (also Romanized as Esmā‘īl Kandī) is a village in Qarah Su Rural District, in the Central District of Khoy County, West Azerbaijan Province, Iran. At the 2006 census, its population was 37, in 8 families.

References 

Populated places in Khoy County